Christmas is a studio album by American recording artist Stephanie Mills, released in October 1991 on MCA Records. The album is a Christmas album, the first by Mills that showcases her soulful renditions of classic Christmas carols such as "White Christmas", "Silent Night", "Rudolph the Red-Nose Reindeer", and soul singer Donny Hathaway's, "This Christmas".

Track listing 
 "This Christmas" (Donny Hathaway, Nadine McKinnor) - 4:53
 "It Doesn’t Feel Like Christmas (Without You)" (Michael Price, Richard Scher) - 4:14
 "We Can Move Mountains" (Randy Kerber, Marybeth Derry) - 4:21
 "Merry Christmas" (Stephanie Mills, Narada Michael Walden) - 4:02
 "Rudolph the Red-Nose Reindeer" (Johnny Marks) - 4:36
 "Silent Night" (Franz Xaver Gruber, Joseph Mohr) - 5:18
 "Christmas with You" (Terry Lupton, Brian Potter) - 4:59
 "Love Is to Listen" (BeBe Winans) - 4:24
 "White Christmas" (Irving Berlin) - 4:10
 "Jingle Baby" (Amanda McBroom, Tom Snow) - 4:09

Notes
 Track 5 contains sample from "Sex Machine" by James Brown and excerpts from "Expression" written by C. James.

Personnel 
 Stephanie Mills – vocals 
 Donald Lawrence – keyboards (1, 5), bass (1, 5), arrangements (1, 5, 9), vocal arrangements (3, 7)
 Kevin Bond – acoustic piano solo (1),  acoustic piano (2), keyboards (2)
 Richard Scher – synthesizers (2), drum programming (2), arrangements (2)
 Steve Barri – additional keyboards (2, 7, 10)
 Tony Peluso – additional keyboards (2, 7, 10), arrangements (10)
 Randy Kerber – keyboards (3, 10), arrangements (3), additional keyboards (7)
 Louis Biancaniello – keyboards (4), programming (4), orchestral arrangements (4)
 Frank Martin – acoustic piano (4)
 John Andrew Schreiner – synthesizers (7), drum programming (7), arrangements (7)
 Cedric Caldwell – keyboards (8), arrangements (8)
 Robbie Buchanan – acoustic piano solo (8)
 Dean Parks – guitars (3, 7, 10), arrangements (10)
 Tom Hemby – guitars (8)
 Neil Stubenhaus – bass (3, 10)
 Joel Smith – bass (6)
 Victor Caldwell – bass (8), drum programming (8)
 John Robinson – drums (3, 10)
 Rodney Barber – drum programming (5), first rap (5)
 Clarence "Flip" Kirby – drums (6)
 Dave Koz – alto saxophone (2), soprano saxophone (6)
 Paul McCandless – oboe (4)
 Joel Peskin – saxophone (10)
 Paul Riser – string arrangements (1, 6)
 Sephra Herman – string contractor (1, 6)
 Narada Michael Walden – arrangements (4)
 Elbernita Clark Terrell – arrangements (6)
 The Company – backing vocals (1-3, 5-7, 9): Reginald Adams, Winston Bagley, Rodney Barber, Jerry Friday, Donald Lawrence, Richard Odom and Terry Phillips 
 Kitty Beethoven, Nikita Germaine, Sandy Griffith, Skyler Jett and Claytoven Richardson – backing vocals (4)
 Terry Phillips – second rap (5)
 Margaret Bell, Sherrie Kibble, Angie Winans, Debra Winans, BeBe Winans and CeCe Winans – backing vocals (8)
 BeBe Winans – BGV arrangements (8)
 The Jinglettes – backing vocals (10): Liz Constantine, Bobbi Page and Terry Wood

Production
 Stephanie Mills – executive producer, producer (1-3, 5-7, 10)
 Donald Lawrence – producer (1-3, 5-7, 9)
 Steve Barri – producer (2, 3, 7, 10)
 Tony Peluso – producer (2, 3, 7, 10), recording (2, 3, 7, 10), mixing (2, 3, 7, 10)
 Richard Scher – co-producer (2)
 Narada Michael Walden – producer (4)
 Louis Biancaniello – associate producer (4)
 Rodney Barber – producer (5)
 David Floyd – recording (1, 5)
 Taavi Môte – recording (1, 5, 6, 9), mixing (1, 5)
 David Frazer – recording (4), mixing (4)
 Keith Blake – recording (7)
 Michael McCartney – recording (8)
 Elliott Peters – recording (8)
 Billy Whittington – recording (8)
 Mark Williams – recording (9)
 Mick Guzauski – mixing (6, 9)
 Ronnie Brookshire – mixing (8)
 G. Aaron Miller – recording assistant (1, 5, 7, 9)
 Fred Kelly – recording assistant (7, 10)
 Brett Perry – assistant engineer (8)
 Roy Snowdon – assistant engineer (8)
 Carry Summers – assistant engineer (8)
 Tracey Schroeder – recording assistant (9)
 Marc Reyburn – additional recording (4)
 Steve Hall – mastering at Future Disc (Hollywood, California)
 Left Bank Management – project coordinator 
 Mark Sullivan – production coordinator (1-3, 5-7, 9, 10)
 Janice Lee, Kelly McRae, Cynthia Shiloh and Kevin Walden – production coordination (4)
 Louis Upkins Jr. – production assistant (8)
 Larry Brooks at Kosh Brooks Design – art direction, design 
 Todd Gray – photography

References

External links
Stephanie Mills-Christmas - amazon.com

1991 Christmas albums
Stephanie Mills albums
Albums produced by Narada Michael Walden
MCA Records albums
Christmas albums by American artists
Contemporary R&B Christmas albums